"Death of a Great Dane" is the eighth episode of the second series of the 1960s cult British spy-fi television series The Avengers, starring Patrick Macnee and Honor Blackman. It was first broadcast by ABC on 17 November 1962. The episode was directed by Peter Hammond and written by Roger Marshall and Jeremy Scott.

Plot
When a road accident victim is found to have £50,000 worth of diamonds in his stomach, Steed and Cathy are called in to investigate.

Cast
 Patrick Macnee as John Steed
 Honor Blackman as Cathy Gale  
 Frederick Jaeger as Getz  
 Leslie French as Gregory
 John Laurie as Sir James Mann  
 Clare Kelly as Mrs. Miller 
 Dennis Edwards as First Assistant 
 Anthony Baird as Second Assistant    
 Billy Milton as Minister
 Eric Elliott as Winetaster   
 Roger Maxwell as Winetaster   
 Herbert Nelson as Gravedigger
 Mike Moyer as Policeman 
 Frank Peters as George Miller 
 Kevin Barry as Kennels Man

References

External links

Episode overview on The Avengers Forever! website

The Avengers (season 2) episodes
1962 British television episodes